Nicholas D'Antonio Salza, O.F.M. (July 10, 1916 – August 1, 2009) was an American bishop of the Roman Catholic Church.

Salza was born in Rochester, New York in 1916. He was ordained a priest on June 7, 1942, from the Order of Friars Minor. Salza was appointed prelate to Inmaculada Concepción de la B.V.M. en Olancho (Honduras) on December 18, 1963, and resigned from this position on August 6, 1977. Salza was ordained a bishop under the Titular See of Giufi Salaria on July 25, 1966. He died on August 1, 2009.

External links
Catholic-Hierarchy
Orders of Friars Minor site

20th-century Roman Catholic bishops in Honduras
Participants in the Second Vatican Council
20th-century American Roman Catholic titular bishops
Religious leaders from Rochester, New York
American Friars Minor
Franciscan bishops
1916 births
2009 deaths
Roman Catholic bishops of Juticalpa